David Carnegie, 2nd Earl of Northesk was born the son of John Carnegie, 1st Earl of Northesk and Magdalen Haliburton before 1627. He died on 12 December 1679. He married Lady Jean Maule, daughter of Patrick Maule, 1st Earl of Panmure, on 19 October 1637 and had seven children:

David Carnegie, 3rd Earl of Northesk (November 1643)
James Carnegie (married Anna Maitland in 1674, d. 10 March 1707)
Patrick Carnegie (married first in 1682 to Marjory Threlpland, daughter of Sir William Threlpland of Fingask, second in 1702 to Margaret Stewart, d. 7 December 1723, ancestor of later Earls of Northeask beginning with the 15th Earl)
Alexander Carnegie (married first to Ann Blair, daughter of Sir William Blair of Kinfauns, second to Margaret Nairne of Muckarsie)
Robert Carnegie (died young)
Jean Carnegie (c. 1645–1679, married Colin Lindsay, 3rd Earl of Balcarres in 1673)
Magdalen Carnegie (married John Moodie of Ardbikie)

References
Burke's Landed Gentry of Great Britain by Peter Beauclerk Dewar.

1679 deaths
David 02
Year of birth unknown